Shterna Glacier is the glacier extending 3.6 km in east-west direction and 2.2 km in north-south direction on Liège Island in the Palmer Archipelago, Antarctica.  It is situated northeast of Sigmen Glacier, draining the north slopes of Brugmann Mountains and flowing northwards into Boisguehenneuc Bay.

The glacier is named after the settlement of Shterna in Southern Bulgaria.

Location
British mapping in 1978.

See also
 List of glaciers in the Antarctic
 Glaciology

Maps
 British Antarctic Territory.  Scale 1:200000 topographic map.  DOS 610 Series, Sheet W 63 60.  Directorate of Overseas Surveys, UK, 1978.
 British Antarctic Territory.  Scale 1:200000 topographic map.  DOS 610 Series, Sheet W 64 60.  Directorate of Overseas Surveys, UK, 1978.
 Antarctic Digital Database (ADD). Scale 1:250000 topographic map of Antarctica. Scientific Committee on Antarctic Research (SCAR). Since 1993, regularly upgraded and updated.

References
 Bulgarian Antarctic Gazetteer. Antarctic Place-names Commission. (details in Bulgarian, basic data in English)
 Shterna Glacier SCAR Composite Antarctic Gazetteer

External links
 Shterna Glacier. Copernix satellite image

Glaciers of the Palmer Archipelago
Bulgaria and the Antarctic
Liège Island